The Saint Nicholas Church or the Nicholas Church is a church building in central Örebro, Sweden. It was originally called the Örebro Church because it was the only Church of Sweden building in town until the early 20th century. Örebro Nikolai  parish is in the Diocese of Strängnäs  of the Church of Sweden.

History
Construction began in the late 13th century and is supposed to have been completed by the mid 14th century.
Large parts of the church are built in the limestone.
There are Romanesque styles in the oldest parts and therefore  Gothic style in the newer.
The oldest is the choir area from around 1275–1300. 

The current look of the church dates from the great restoration in 1863–1900 when the church's Gothic style was emphasized.
The restoration proposal had been made by Carl Georg Brunius (1793–1869) and was completed by Axel Herman Hägg (1835–1921) and associate professor Adolf Kjellström (1834–1932).
Partial renovations took place in 1936 under the direction of architect Erik Fant (1889–1954) and in 1962–64 after drawings by architect Kurt von Schmalensee (1896–1972). The latest renovation took place in 1979–80.

References

External links

Orebro Nicholas
Nicholas Church
Orebro Nicholas
Churches in Örebro County
Churches in the Diocese of Strängnäs